Ancistrocerus parietum is a species of insects belonging to the family Vespidae.

It is native to Europe and Northern America.

References

Vespidae